Cicindela maritima is a species of medium-sized (12 to 15 mm long) ground beetles native to Europe, where it is found in Belgium, Croatia, mainland Denmark, Finland, mainland France, Germany, Great Britain including the Isle of Man, Kaliningrad, Latvia, Moldova, mainland Norway, Poland, mainland Portugal (doubtful), Romania (doubtful), Russia except in the North, Sweden, the Netherlands, and Ukraine.

References

External links
Cicindela maritima Global Biodiversity Information Facility

maritima
Beetles described in 1822